Switzerland competed at the 1996 Summer Olympics in Atlanta, United States. 114 competitors, 71 men and 43 women, took part in 83 events in 17 sports.

Medalists

Athletics

Men's 1,500 metres 
 Peter Philipp
 Qualification — 3:41.60 (→ did not advance)

Men's 4 × 400 m Relay
Laurent Clerc, Kevin Widmer, Alain Rohr, and Mathias Rusterholz
 Heat — 3:03.05
 Semi Final — 3:05.36 (→ did not advance)

Men's 400m Hurdles
Marcel Schelbert
 Heat — 51.20s (→ did not advance)

Men's Decathlon 
 Philipp Huber
 Final Result — 7743 points (→ 28th place)

Men's 50 km Walk
Pascal Charrière — 4:10:20 (→ 31st place)

Women's 400 metres
 Corinne Simasotchi
 Heat — 53.69 (→ did not advance)

Women's 10,000 metres
 Daria Nauer
 Qualification — 33:56.95 (→ did not advance)

 Ursula Jeitziner
 Qualification — did not finish (→ did not advance)

Women's 400m Hurdles
Michele Schenk
 Qualification — 55.70
 Semifinals — 55.96 (→ did not advance)

Martina Stoop
 Qualification — 56.32 (→ did not advance)

Women's High Jump
 Sieglinde Cadusch
 Qualification — 1.85m (→ did not advance)

Women's Heptathlon 
 Patricia Nadler
 Final Result — 5803 points (→ 23rd place)

Women's Marathon
 Franziska Rochat-Moser — 2:34.48 (→ 18th place)
 Nelly Glauser — 2:37.19 (→ 34th place)

Badminton

Canoeing

Cycling

Road Competition

Men's Individual Time Trial
Tony Rominger 
 Final — 1:06:05 (→ 5th place)

Alex Zülle
 Final — 1:06:33 (→ 7th place)

Women's Individual Road Race
Barbara Heeb 
 Final — 02:37:06 (→ 8th place)

Yvonne Schnorf 
 Final — 02:37:06 (→ 13th place)

Diana Rast 
 Final — 02:37:06 (→ 15th place)

Women's Individual Time Trial
Diana Rast 
 Final — 39:28 (→ 15th place)

Track Competition
Men's Points Race
 Bruno Risi
 Final — 8 points (→ 17th place)

Mountain Bike
Men's Cross Country
 Thomas Frischknecht
 Final — 2:20:14 (→  Silver Medal)

 Beat Wabel
 Final — 2:32:17 (→ 14th place)

Women's Cross Country
 Daniela Gassmann
 Final — 1:59.11 (→ 12th place)

 Silvia Fürst
 Final — 2:03.04 (→ 16th place)

Equestrian

Fencing

Five fencers, two men and three women, represented Switzerland in 1996.

Men's épée
 Nic Bürgin
 Olivier Jacquet

Women's épée
 Gianna Hablützel-Bürki
 Michèle Wolf
 Sandra Kenel

Women's team épée
 Gianna Hablützel-Bürki, Michèle Wolf, Sandra Kenel

Gymnastics

Handball

Judo

Modern pentathlon

Men's Competition
 Philipp Wäffler → 29th place (4774 pts)

Rowing

Sailing

Shooting

Swimming

Women's 50m Freestyle
 Dominique Diezi
 Heat — 26.57 (→ did not advance, 32nd place)

Women's 100m Freestyle
 Sandrine Paquier
 Heat — 58.38 (→ did not advance, 36th place)

Women's 400m Freestyle
 Chantal Strasser
 Heat — 4:24.49 (→ did not advance, 35th place)

Women's 4 × 100 m Freestyle Relay
 Dominique Diezi, Nicole Zahnd, Lara Preacco, and Sandrine Paquier
 Heat — 3:53.30 (→ did not advance, 17th place)

Women's 4 × 200 m Freestyle Relay
  Sandrine Paquier, Dominique Diezi, Nicole Zahnd, and Chantal Strasser
 Heat — 8:21.55 (→ did not advance, 16th place)

Table tennis

Tennis

Men's Singles Competition
 Marc Rosset 
 First round — Defeated Hicham Arazi (Morocco) 6-2 6-3
 Second round — Defeated Frederik Fetterlein (Denmark) 7-6 7-5
 Third round — Lost to Renzo Furlan (Italy) 0-6 2-4 retired

Women's Singles Competition
 Martina Hingis
 First round — Defeated Joelle Schad (Dominican Republic) 6-0 6-1
 Second round — Lost to Ai Sugiyama (Japan) 4-6 4-6
 Patty Schnyder
 First round — Lost to Conchita Martínez (Spain) 1-6 2-6

Wrestling

References

1996 in Swiss sport
Nations at the 1996 Summer Olympics
1996 Summer Olympics